Adis Hasečić (born March 11, 1987) is a Bosnian footballer who plays as a midfielder for SV der Bosnier.

Playing career

Early career 
Hasečić played with FK Famos Hrasnica in 2008. He would play in the country's top tier the Premier League of Bosnia and Herzegovina with FK Olimpik the following season. In his debut season in Sarajevo, he would play in two matches.

Waterloo Region 
In 2012, he played abroad in the Canadian Soccer League with SC Waterloo Region. He made his debut on May 20, 2012, against London City and recorded two goals. He re-signed with Waterloo for the 2013 season. Hasečić would have a productive sophomore season with Waterloo where he finished as the club's top goal scorer with 17 goals. The club would also secure a postseason berth by finishing fifth in the First Division. In the opening round of the playoffs, he contributed a goal against Brampton United which helped advance the club to the next round. Hasečić successfully contributed a penalty goal in the second round where Waterloo defeated Toronto Croatia in a penalty shootout. He participated in the CSL Championship final where Waterloo defeated divisional champions Kingston FC for the title.   

After the conclusion of the Bosnian football season, he returned to Waterloo for the summer of 2014. He helped the club secure a postseason berth and played in the quarterfinal match of the playoffs against Toronto Croatia where Waterloo was eliminated from the competition. After another season abroad Hasečić returned to Waterloo for his fourth consecutive season in the summer of 2015. He finished as the club's top goal scorer with 16 goals and assisted in securing a playoff berth. In the preliminary round of the playoffs, he scored the final goal against Toronto Atomic which advanced Waterloo to the next round. He would contribute another goal in the second round against the Serbian White Eagles which clinched another championship final appearance. In the championship final, Toronto Croatia defeated Waterloo.

Bosnia 
In early 2014 he returned to Bosnia's premier league to sign with NK Travnik. Throughout the season he played in 10 matches and recorded two goals. He re-signed with Travnik for the 2014-15 season. In his final season in the top flight, he appeared in 10 matches and recorded one goal. His lone goal for Travnik occurred on May 15, 2015, against Zvijezda Gradačac. In 2015, he played in the First League of the Federation of Bosnia and Herzegovina with NK Bosna Visoko.

Later career 
After the relegation of Waterloo to the Second Division, he signed with league rivals Scarborough SC in 2016. In his debut season with Scarborough, he finished as the club's top goal scorer with 11 goals. He returned to Waterloo Region when the club was promoted back to the First Division in 2017. The 2018 season would mark his sixth season with the Waterloo organization, and he would assist the club in securing a playoff berth by finishing third. They defeated the Serbs in the quarterfinals but were eliminated in the semifinals to FC Vorkuta in a penalty shootout. 

He returned for his seventh and final season with Waterloo in the 2019 season. In 2022, he returned to Europe to play in the German Verbandsliga Hessen-Süd with SV der Bosnier. In his debut season in the Verbandsliga, he appeared in 5 matches and recorded 4 goals.

References  
 

Living people
1987 births
Association football midfielders
Bosnia and Herzegovina footballers
FK Famos Hrasnica players
FK Olimpik players
SC Waterloo Region players
NK Travnik players
NK Bosna Visoko players
Scarborough SC players
Premier League of Bosnia and Herzegovina players
First League of the Federation of Bosnia and Herzegovina players
Canadian Soccer League (1998–present) players
Footballers from Sarajevo